The Making of O'Malley is a 1925 American silent drama film directed by Lambert Hillyer and written by Eugene Clifford. The film stars Milton Sills, Dorothy Mackaill, Helen Rowland, Warner Richmond, Thomas Carrigan and Julia Hurley. The film was released on June 28, 1925, by First National Pictures. The Gerald Beaumont short story was also the basis of the 1937 Warner Bros. film The Great O'Malley, directed by William Dieterle and starring Pat O'Brien and Humphrey Bogart.

Plot
As described in a film magazine review, Lucille tires of her time as a young society woman and takes a position in the public schools. She requests aid in capturing a band of bootleggers. Policeman O'Malley is sent with orders to obey Lucille. O'Malley makes friends with Margie, a crippled child, whose father is in prison because O'Malley arrested him. O'Malley obtains a pardon for this man. Herbert Browne, the head of the bootleggers, is an admirer of Lucille. On the night of a masquerade ball held by Lucille, a raid is made on the band of bootleggers and Browne is found. He knocks O'Malley unconscious. When O'Malley reaches the ball, Browne is there. O'Malley arrests Browne while masking his face, but then releases him when he realizes he is Lucille's sweetheart. As O'Malley leaves the house, he is shot by Danny, whom he had received a pardon for. Danny divulges the name of Browne to the police captain. Realizing the magnamity of O'Malley, Lucille turns to him as the film ends.

Cast

References

External links

 
 
 
 
 Stills at silenthollywood.com
 Stills at silentfilmstillarchive.com

1925 films
1920s English-language films
Silent American drama films
1925 drama films
First National Pictures films
Films directed by Lambert Hillyer
American silent feature films
American black-and-white films
1920s American films
English-language drama films